The 2000–01 campaign was the 95th season in Atlético Madrid's history and their 1st season in Segunda División of Spanish football. Also the club competed in Copa del Rey.

Summary 
For the first time ever, Atletico competes in a Segunda División tournament since 1929 when Primera División was registered as the top league. Owing to a chaotic environment outside the field in spite of President Gil appointing club legend Paulo Futre as Manager on 3 November 2000 and three coaches fired, the team never reached the 3rd position on the table and classifying to La Liga finishing tied in points along CD Tenerife but lost the goal average.

Squad

Transfers

Winter

Competitions

Segunda División

League table

Results by round

Matches

Copa del Rey

Round of 64

Round of 32

Eightfinals

Quarterfinals

Semifinals

Statistics

Players statistics

Squad statistics

References

External links 
 Campaign of Atlético Madrid in 2000–01 season.
 Matches of Atlético Madrid in 2000–01 season.

2000-01
Spanish football clubs 2000–01 season